Balbi Holy Conversation (also known as Titian Madonna and Child with Sts Catherine and Dominic and a Donor) is an oil painting by the Italian late Renaissance painter Titian, dated to around 1513, and now held at the Fondazione Magnani-Rocca in Traversetolo, near Parma, northern Italy.

The work was originally part of marquess Balbi's collection at Genoa, hence the name. It is a work from the artist's youth, set in an open landscape, with some Giorgione influences but already some personal elements, such as the asymmetrical composition and the full figures.

References

Sources

External links
Page at museum website 

1513 paintings
Religious paintings by Titian
Paintings of the Madonna and Child
Paintings in the collection of the Magnani-Rocca Foundation